Mountain Ash Comprehensive School, known as MACS, is a comprehensive school near the town of Mountain Ash, Rhondda Cynon Taf, Wales. It is a mixed-sex school with approximately 950 pupils, including about 90 in the sixth form. The school was formerly known as Mountain Ash Grammar School and is located near the former Dyffryn Colliery.

Teaching
Mountain Ash Comprehensive School offers a range of subjects. Subjects that are taught at the school include: English, Cymraeg (Welsh), Science, Maths, Art, Music, Physical Education (PE), Information Communications Technology (ICT), Religious Studies (RS), Geography, History, French, Drama, Business Studies, Design Technology (which includes: Wood work, Home Economics, Engineering, Textiles), Hospitality, Vocational Studies.

A high proportion of the pupils move on to Sixth Form, college or other training organisations.

Catchment area
The school's catchment area includes:

A few pupils come from further away, including from Aberaman, Abercwmboi and Cwmbach.

The main feeder primary schools are:

History
The school was founded as Mountain Ash County School in 1907, which was later known as Mountain Ash Grammar School. From 1926 until 1983 the school was based in Dyffryn House, the former home of Henry Bruce, 1st Baron Aberdare (1815–1895). The house was found to be unsafe and was demolished; the current school is on the same site.

Selective education was abolished in the area in 1966, when the school became Mountain Ash Comprehensive School.

In 2019, five pupils won international travel scholarships: two to build a school in Rajasthan, India, two to explore in the Yukon, Canada and one to visit the  Massachusetts Institute of Technology in the USA.

School mottos
The school also uses "Every Child Will Succeed".

Community

The school is a community school and takes that role very seriously. The school's aim is to be a place of learning and enjoyment not only for the students but for the wider community as well. Mountain Ash Comprehensive School is open for business from 8.00 in the morning through to 9.30 at night. Many national and local groups and organisations use Mountain Ash Comprehensive School's facilities. The University of Glamorgan base their Welsh for Adults provision at the school, and many local sporting clubs use the school's gym and barn facilities. The school runs tea dances for the elderly and organise many courses from the school during the holiday periods.

The school houses a community room which is home to E3, 5×60, On Track, and other specialist community workers. The school has developed developing the Mountain Ash Partnership to support local organisations working with young people in this area to work together constructively.

Cynon Valley 16+ Consortium
The school is a member of the Cynon Valley 16+ Consortium which combines the sixth-form teaching resources of several local schools. These schools have approximately 350 sixth-form students, most of whom travel between the schools for tuition. The schools have a common sixth form timetable and a common registration and assessment management information system.

The students have access to a full sixth form curriculum to include a total of approximately 44 subjects which include traditional AS Level, A2 level and GCSE courses, and vocational BTEC, OCR and Key Skills courses. Some of the vocational courses are taught at Coleg y Cymoedd's Aberdare campus and at Merthyr Tydfil College.

Notable former pupils

 Edmund Davies, Baron Edmund-Davies of Aberpennar (1906–1992), law lord (senior judge), chairman of the Aberfan Disaster Tribunal
 Les Manfield  (1915–2006), Welsh Rugby Union international, later deputy headmaster of the school
 Bruce George (1942–), former Labour MP for Walsall South
 Stephen Williams (1966–), former Liberal Democrat MP for Bristol West
 Samantha Bowen (1986–), soldier and paralympic sitting volleyball player

References

External links
School website

Secondary schools in Rhondda Cynon Taf
School